Archives of Oral Biology is a monthly peer-reviewed scientific journal covering oral and craniofacial research in all vertebrates, including work in palaeontology and comparative anatomy. It was established in 1959 and is published by Elsevier. The editors-in-chief are currently S. W. Cadden (University of Dundee) and F. T. Lundy (Queen's University Belfast).

Abstracting and indexing 
The journal is abstracted and indexed in:

According to the Journal Citation Reports, the journal has a 2012 impact factor of 1.549.

References

External links 
Archives of Oral Biology

Zoology journals
Elsevier academic journals
Monthly journals
Publications established in 1959
English-language journals